These are the results from the synchronized swimming competition at the 1994 World Aquatics Championships, which were held in Rome in September 1994.

Medal table

Medalists

References

 
1994 World Aquatics Championships
Synchronised swimming at the World Aquatics Championships
1994 in synchronized swimming
Synchronised swimming in Italy